Nathan Fyfe (born 18 September 1991) is a professional Australian rules footballer playing for the Fremantle Football Club in the Australian Football League (AFL). He served as Fremantle captain from 2017 to 2022, becoming the second-longest serving captain in the club's history. Fyfe is a dual Brownlow Medallist, dual Leigh Matthews Trophy recipient, three-time All-Australian (including as captain in the 2019 team) and three-time Doig Medallist. He received a nomination for the 2010 AFL Rising Star award in round 9 of the 2010 season.

Early life
Fyfe grew up in Lake Grace, Western Australia, and went to school as a boarder at Aquinas College in Perth. In 2009, he played West Australian Football League colts for Claremont, his highlights of the season being his eight-goal, 34 possession effort against East Fremantle and six goals in the Colts Grand Final. In 2010, he made his league debut, kicking 4 goals against Peel Thunder.

He was also selected for Western Australia in the 2009 AFL National Under 18 Championships and played four of the five games, kicking nine goals. His best return came in the game against Vic Metro in which he scored four goals.

AFL career

2010–2012: Early career
Fyfe was selected by the Fremantle Dockers with the 20th pick in the 2009 national draft. Fyfe made his debut in Fremantle's 39-point win over the Richmond Tigers in the annual Len Hall ANZAC Day game at Subiaco Oval in 2010. He announced his arrival in the AFL with a soaring pack mark. A week later he was nominated for Goal of the Week after a brilliant snap against West Coast. Fyfe became the 150th player to represent the Fremantle Dockers at AFL level. He was awarded the AFL Rising Star nomination for Round 9 in the 2010 AFL season after performing well in Fremantle's first victory over the Sydney Swans in Sydney since 1996. He collected 23 possessions, four clearances, five tackles and seven marks and played on senior Sydney player Ryan O'Keefe for most of the game.

Fyfe continued to improve and had a sensational second season in the AFL, finishing a close second to Matthew Pavlich in the Doig Medal. He featured in the top five in almost every key performance indicator category at Fremantle in 2011. Fyfe topped the club in disposals per game (25.1), total disposals (527), contested possessions (262), hard ball gets (107), total effective handballs (186), contested marks (43), smothers (19) and Dream Team points (98.4 per game). His form led him to be considered as a potential All-Australian team selection and gained comparisons to past champion James Hird. Fyfe polled an equal team high 13 Brownlow Medal votes and was selected in the initial All-Australian squad of 40 but did not make the final team. At the end of the 2011 season, Fyfe resigned with Fremantle on a three-year deal, set to expire in 2014.

Fyfe made a strong start to the 2012 AFL Season with a best-on-ground performance against Geelong in their Round 1 match at Patersons Stadium, recording 30 disposals and 2 goals in the 4-point win over the Cats. Fyfe began dealing with a shoulder injury during April, and attempted to play through it, but was forced out and underwent surgery in May after dislocating it at training. Fyfe missed the majority of the season, being sidelined from Round 6 until 18. He returned to Fremantle in Round 18 against Port Adelaide, returning to his previous form by recording, 26 disposals. Fyfe only missed one game for the remainder of the season, missing a game against Adelaide in Round 20 due to an ankle injury incurred on the morning of the match in his hotel room. Despite playing only nine games in the home and away season – two of which were compromised because of his shoulder, Fyfe still polled the second-most Brownlow Medal votes (14) at Fremantle. On a per game basis, Fyfe was clearly Fremantle's best contested possession winner (12.5), which was also 14th overall in the AFL.

2013–2015: Grand final appearance and first Brownlow Medal
Fyfe continued to improve throughout the 2013 AFL Season, increasing his average disposals from the previous two years (25.9) and winning his first Doig Medal, beating out David Mundy. Fyfe had a hand in leading Fremantle to a 16-1-5 win–loss record, helping them finish third on the ladder, and reaching their first ever AFL Grand Final in club history, but despite having an equal game-high 28 disposals in the match, the Dockers were defeated by Hawthorn by 15 points, ending the club's best season in their 19-year history just short of their first premiership success. Fyfe had a strong final's series, averaging 26.0 disposals. Fyfe announced early in 2014 that he would not consider extending his contract with Fremantle until later in the year, leading to speculation that he might change clubs when his contract expired at the end of the season. However, he agreed to extend his contract with Fremantle for a further three years in late June.

Fyfe started the 2014 AFL Season strongly, but was controversially suspended for two weeks in Round 2 for a bump on Gold Coast player Michael Rischitelli. He was one of the first players to be suspended under a new rule that penalised the player for any head contact as a result of choosing to bump instead of tackle. Throughout the season, Fyfe was considered to be one of the favourites to win the Brownlow Medal, but was ineligible due to the suspension. Fyfe played in his 100th senior appearance for Fremantle in Round 8 against North Melbourne, Fyfe recorded 37 disposals and 11 clearances in the 73-point win. Fyfe continued his strong form for the remainder of the season, increasing his average disposal count from 25.9 to 27.0 a game, recording a career-high goals (24), and was now being considered one of the elite midfielders in the league. He was suspended again late in the season for a behind the play strike on Jordan Lewis, missing the final two matches before returning for the finals. Fyfe had a strong final series, recording 29 disposals, 5 inside-fifties, 7 clearances and 1 goal in the qualifying final against Sydney. Fyfe followed up that performance by recording 28 disposals, 11 tackles, 7 clearances, and 2 goals in the semi-final against Port Adelaide, despite his strong performances Fremantle were eliminated from the finals in straight sets, losing both games. Fyfe's tremendous season was recognised when he received several individual honours, he was awarded Leigh Matthews Trophy at the 2014 AFL Players Association awards, as the league's most valuable player (MVP). Fyfe polled 945 votes, ahead of five-time winner Gary Ablett with 787 votes. Fyfe then received his second Doig Medal for successive seasons and made his first All-Australian team, being included in the midfield. Despite being ineligible to win the Brownlow Medal, Fyfe finished with 25 votes, one vote behind the winner Matt Priddis (26).

Fyfe carried his strong form into the 2015 AFL Season, recording 31 disposals, 1 goal, and 7 inside-fifties in Fremantle's Round 1 win over Port Adelaide. Fyfe continued that form throughout the season, once again increasing his disposal average from previous seasons with 28.8 per-game. Along with his own individual dominance, Fyfe helped Fremantle to a 17–5 win–loss record, resulting in Fremantle finishing 1st on the ladder for the first time in club history and claiming the McClelland Trophy. Fyfe had a strong start to the finals series, recording 32 disposals and 8 clearances in Fremantle's win over Sydney in the qualifying final. Fyfe played in Fremantle's preliminary final loss against Hawthorn with a fractured leg, only recording 24 disposals in the 27-point loss. Fyfe only played in 18 home-and-away games during the season, but was still able to win the Brownlow Medal, polling 31 votes, whilst collecting 29 votes from Rounds 2 to 14. He became the first Brownlow Medal winner from Fremantle and polled three votes ahead of the previous winner, Matt Priddis. To Round out the 2015 season, Fyfe won his second Leigh Matthews Trophy at the 2015 AFL Players Association awards, as the league's most valuable player (MVP) for successive years, was named the WA Media Awards AFL Player of the Year, the WA Sports Star of the Year, and made his second successive All-Australian Team as a midfielder.

2016–2018: Injury struggles and captaincy

Fyfe opened the 2016 AFL Season with a poor performance against the Western Bulldogs, only recording 15 disposals, but Fyfe quickly turned his form around and looked set to have a career best season, recording a total of 87 disposals, 8 goals, 21 tackles, and 22 clearances in the next three games, during those three games Fyfe kicked an equal game-high four goals against North Melbourne in Round 4. Unfortunately for Fyfe, he suffered another fracture to the same leg in Round 5. He had a plate inserted into the leg, and in May 2016, following medical advice, Fremantle opted to have the plate removed once the bone had healed, ruling Fyfe out for the remainder of the season. Without Fyfe, Fremantle dropped from minor premiers (1st) in 2015 to 16th in 2016.

In February 2017, Fyfe was announced as Fremantle's captain and he returned from his injury during the 2017 JLT Community Series against the West Coast Eagles, he recorded 22 disposals in the 55-point loss. Fyfe's stats decreased during the 2017 season, only averaging 26.4 disposals down from the 28.8 he averaged during the 2015 season. Fyfe still had a strong season, kicking 17 goals and recording a career-high tackles (96). Fyfe represented Australia in the 2017 International Rules Series and was awarded the Jim Stynes Medal. (best player in the series). Fyfe missed out on the All-Australian Team, not even being named in the initial 40-man squad. He polled 15 votes at 2017 Brownlow Medal, finishing 11th. In July 2017, Fyfe signed a six-year contract extension with Fremantle – the longest contract extension in the club's history – tying him to the Dockers until 2023.

Fyfe was in career-best form at the start of the 2018 AFL season, playing a match-winning hand in a number of the club's early wins. This included a career-best 43 disposals against the Western Bulldogs and 14 clearances against Gold Coast. In his 150th senior appearance for Fremantle, Fyfe recorded 30 disposals, 2 goals, and 7 inside-fifties, along with earning a goal of the year nomination for his crafty snap against Carlton in the 57-point win. Fyfe suffered a hamstring injury in Fremantle's Round 15 clash against the Brisbane Lions, hobbling off in the first quarter, and resulting in him spending six weeks on the sidelines. Fyfe returned in Fremantle's Round 22 clash against Geelong, recording 37 disposals and 7 clearances, despite the best on ground performance, Geelong demolished Fremantle by 133 points. Fyfe once again missed the All-Australian Team, not making the 40-man squad.

2019–present: Career-best form and second Brownlow Medal
Fyfe started the 2019 AFL season strongly, recording 32 disposals, 8 inside-fifties, and 10 clearances in Fremantle's Round 1 clash against North Melbourne, Fyfe followed up that performance with a similar one the next week, recording 31 disposals and 9 clearances. Fyfe continued this form throughout the season and was considered as being one of the favourites to win the Brownlow Medal. Fyfe finished the season with a career-high disposals (583) and a career-high average, increasing his disposal average to 29.2. Fyfe made the 2019 All-Australian Team, his first time making it since 2015, and was named Captain of the team for the first time in his career. Fyfe won his second Brownlow Medal, becoming a dual Brownlow Medallist, and becoming the 15th player in VFL/AFL history to win it twice, Fyfe polled a career-high votes (33), beating out the runner-up Patrick Dangerfield by 6 votes (27 votes).

After a good start to the 2020 season, which was impacted by the COVID-19 pandemic, Fyfe suffered a minor hamstring injury in Round 4 against Gold Coast.

Fyfe played almost half of the 2021 AFL season before being side lined for three games after injuring his shoulder in Fremantle's Round 12 clash against the Western Bulldogs. Round 17 saw Fyfe play his 200th game, he was arguably best on ground collecting 31 disposals and kicking a goal in Fremantle's 62-point victory over Hawthorn. Fyfe had his season cut short when he reinjured his shoulder in Fremantle's Round 19 clash against Sydney.

Fyfe missed the first half of the 2022 AFL season after an off-season shoulder operation impacted his pre-season. Fyfe made his return to football through the WAFL playing for Peel Thunder, Fyfe's first WAFL appearance since the 2010 AFL season. He made his AFL return during Fremantle's round thirteen clash against Hawthorn. 
Fyfe suffered a hamstring injury during Fremantle's round nineteen clash against  which saw him side lined for the next three games, he made his return during Fremantle's round 23 clash against . Fyfe was expected to partake in Fremantle's finals campaign but another hamstring injury sustained during training on the opposite leg of his previous hamstring injury saw him ruled out for the remainder of the season. On 7 February 2023, Fyfe relinquished captaincy of the Club after six seasons as captain.

Statistics
Updated to the end of round 1, 2023.

|-
| 2010 ||  || 13
| 18 || 14 || 14 || 173 || 117 || 290 || 82 || 54 || 0.8 || 0.8 || 9.6 || 6.5 || 16.1 || 4.6 || 3.0 || 5
|-
| 2011 ||  || 7
| 21 || 18 || 14 || 253 || 274 || 527 || 111 || 85 || 0.9 || 0.7 || 12.0 || 13.0 || 25.1 || 5.3 || 4.0 || 13
|-
| 2012 ||  || 7
| 11 || 4 || 3 || 157 || 100 || 257 || 44 || 41 || 0.4 || 0.3 || 14.3 || 9.1 || 23.4 || 4.0 || 3.7 || 14
|-
| 2013 ||  || 7
| 22 || 18 || 13 || 339 || 230 || 569 || 98 || 74 || 0.8 || 0.6 || 15.4 || 10.4 || 25.9 || 4.4 || 3.4 || 18
|-
| 2014 ||  || 7
| 20 || 24 || 10 || 260 || 279 || 539 || 79 || 94 || 1.2 || 0.5 || 13.0 || 14.0 || 27.0 || 4.0 || 4.7 || 25
|-
| 2015 ||  || 7
| 20 || 17 || 14 || 275 || 301 || 576 || 84 || 86 || 0.8 || 0.7 || 13.8 || 15.0 || 28.8 || 4.2 || 4.3 || bgcolor=98FB98 | 31±
|-
| 2016 ||  || 7
| 5 || 9 || 2 || 47 || 70 || 117 || 21 || 26 || 1.8 || 0.4 || 9.4 || 14.0 || 23.4 || 4.2 || 5.2 || 4
|-
| 2017 ||  || 7
| 21 || 17 || 13 || 236 || 319 || 555 || 97 || 96 || 0.8 || 0.6 || 11.2 || 15.2 || 26.4 || 4.6 || 4.6 || 15
|-
| 2018 ||  || 7
| 15 || 11 || 11 || 204 || 226 || 430 || 70 || 60 || 0.7 || 0.7 || 13.6 || 15.1 || 28.7 || 4.7 || 4.0 || 16
|-
| 2019 ||  || 7
| 20 || 16 || 13 || 279 || 304 || 583 || 96 || 79 || 0.8 || 0.7 || 14.0 || 15.2 || 29.2 || 4.8 || 4.0 || bgcolor=98FB98 | 33±
|-
| 2020 ||  || 7
| 14 || 10 || 6 || 130 || 170 || 300 || 43 || 42 || 0.7 || 0.4 || 9.3 || 12.1 || 21.4 || 3.1 || 3.0 || 10
|-
| 2021 ||  || 7
| 15 || 6 || 21 || 154 || 207 || 361 || 58 || 61 || 0.4 || 1.4 || 10.3 || 13.8 || 24.1 || 3.9 || 4.1 || 3
|-
| 2022 ||  || 7
| 7 || 6 || 4 || 37 || 69 || 106 || 20 || 20 || 0.9 || 0.6 || 5.3 || 9.9 || 15.1 || 2.9 || 2.9 || 0
|-
| 2023 ||  || 7
| 1 || 0 || 0 || 7 || 2 || 9 || 7 || 2 || 0.0 || 0.0 || 7.0 || 2.0 || 9.0 || 7.0 || 2.0 || 
|- class=sortbottom
! colspan=3 | Career
! 210 !! 170 !! 138 !! 2551 !! 2668 !! 5219 !! 908 !! 820 !! 0.8 !! 0.7 !! 12.1 !! 12.7 !! 24.9 !! 4.3 !! 3.9 !! 187
|}

Notes

Honours and achievements
Team
 McClelland Trophy: 2015

Individual
 Fremantle captain: 2017–2022
 2× Brownlow Medal: 2015, 2019
 2× Leigh Matthews Trophy: 2014, 2015
 3× All-Australian team: 2014, 2015, 2019 (c)
 3× Doig Medal: 2013, 2014, 2019
 Jim Stynes Medal: 2017
 Australia representative honours in international rules football: 2017
 All Stars representative honours in State of Origin for Bushfire Relief Match
 AFLCA best young player of the year: 2011
 5× Geoff Christian Medal: 2013, 2015, 2017, 2019, 2020
 2× Western Australian Sports Star of the Year: 2015, 2019
 22under22 team: 2013
 AFL Rising Star nominee: 2010

References

External links

 
 

1991 births
Living people
All-Australians (AFL)
Australian rules footballers from Western Australia
Brownlow Medal winners
Claremont Football Club players
Doig Medal winners
Fremantle Football Club players
Sportsmen from Western Australia
People educated at Aquinas College, Perth
People from Lake Grace, Western Australia
Australian people of Scottish descent
Australia international rules football team players
Leigh Matthews Trophy winners
Peel Thunder Football Club players
Fremantle Football Club captains